1100 Peachtree Street is one of the prominent buildings of Midtown Atlanta, Georgia.

Ownership and usage
The 28-story,  building is currently owned by Manulife Financial. It was previously partly owned and largely occupied by telecommunications company AT&T Corporation providing offices for its top executives. Besides AT&T, the other major occupant is law firm Kilpatrick Townsend & Stockton LLP. In November 2006, law firm Schreeder, Wheeler and Flint, LLP became the building's tenants.

Design
The octagonal building has a ziggurat-like, stair-stepped top with lighting which accentuates the building at night. Completed in 1991, the building is 428 ft (130 m) tall. It is one of several buildings built in a period in Atlanta in which architects apparently attempted to one-up each other with their ornate and dramatically-lit "wedding-cake" skyscraper tops. 1100 Peachtree received the EPA "Energy Star" designation in 2000, the first high-rise in Atlanta to be so named. Building architects were Smallwood, Reynolds, Stewart, Stewart & Associates, Inc.

See also
List of tallest buildings in Atlanta

External links
Officesat1100Peachtree.com]
Emporis.com

Skyscraper office buildings in Atlanta
Office buildings completed in 1991
1991 establishments in Georgia (U.S. state)